Saint Irene may refer to:
 Irene of Thessalonica, one of three virgin sisters killed in 304, feast day April 3
 Irene of Rome (died c. 288), wife of martyr Saint Castulus, feast day January 22
 Irene of Tomar (died c. 653), of Portugal, feast day October 20
  (died in 2nd century or 315), considered great-martyr with feast day May 5 (Eastern Orthodox liturgics) in Eastern Orthodox churches
 Irene of Cappadocia, abbess, feast day July 28 (Eastern Orthodox liturgics) in Eastern Orthodox churches
 Irene of Hungary, empress (died 1134), feast day August 13 in Eastern Orthodox churches
 Hagia Irene church in Istanbul is often called "St Irene", although it is actually named after the "Holy (Divine) Peace"
 Irene of Athens, Byzantine Roman Empress (born c. 752, Athens—died Aug. 9, 803, Lesbos), feast day August 9 in the Greek Orthodox Church

See also 

 Irene (disambiguation)
 Irina
 Santorini